Beryl Davis (16 March 1924 – 28 October 2011) was a vocalist who sang with British and American big bands, as well as being an occasional featured vocalist at a very young age with the Quintette du Hot Club de France between 1936 and 1939. She was still performing (in her 80s) into the 2000s, possibly the last surviving and performing singer of the generation of popular entertainers from the 1930s and wartime years.

Early life and family 
Davis was born in Plymouth, England, to Harry Lomax Davis and Queenie Davis. Her younger sister is Lisa Davis Waltz, a teen actress in the 1950s and 1960s and later, the voice of Anita in Disney's 101 Dalmatians.

Career
Aged eight, Davis began to sing for the Oscar Rabin Band, co-led by her father and saxophonist Oscar Rabin, eventually turning professional and singing with, among others, Rabin, Geraldo, and the Skyrockets Dance Orchestra. From the age of 12, accompanied by a chaperone, she also performed and recorded with Django Reinhardt in Paris and on several European tours, and was the featured singer with the Quintette du Hot Club de France during their tour of the U.K. in July-August 1939, including a performance with the Quintette for BBC Television (broadcast in August 1939), of which, unfortunately, no copy appears to survive. She became popular singing for British and Allied troops during World War II, during which time Glenn Miller discovered her in London, and she sang for the Army Air Force Orchestra. After the war, she moved to Los Angeles with her father's big band, and appeared on Your Hit Parade with Frank Sinatra for a year.

She was part of the Four Girls singing group with Jane Russell, Rhonda Fleming, Della Russell, and Connie Haines. They recorded sixteen singles, and albums which became best sellers. Davis also appeared both in variety shows and films.

Personal life and death 
She was married to William Mann Moore (aka Peter Potter), disc jockey and host of the 1950s Emmy Winning television show, Jukebox Jury. They had three children, William Bell, Merry Bell, and Melinda Beryl. The marriage ended in divorce. 

In 1996, a Golden Palm Star on the Palm Springs, California, Palm Springs Walk of Stars was dedicated to her. Still performing into her 80s, she was featured at several concerts/festivals in the mid-2000s with the backing of the guitarist John Jorgenson and his band, who featured her vocals on the track "Don't Worry 'Bout Me" on his 2007 CD Ultraspontane, reprising her original recording with Django Reinhardt from almost 70 years earlier.

On 28 October 2011, Davis died in Los Angeles from complications of Alzheimer's disease, at age 87.

Discography
 Beryl By Candle-Light, (RCA Victor, 1948)
 Beryl Davis, (Zodiac Records, 1976)
 I'll Be Seeing You, (Hindsight, 1999)
 Alone Together,  (2000)
 I Hear a Dream, (2001)
 Feel the Spirit, (Jasmine, 2008) - compilation of tracks released for Coral and Capitol in the 1950s

References

External links

 Beryl Davis - Biographical page on Big Band Buddies
 Beryl Davis of the Four Girls -  brief biography on Pointing North †
 Beryl Davis, Discogs - discography on www.discogs.com
 Jane Russell;Peter Potter;Connie Haines;Beryl Davis. Jane Russell, Beryl Davis and Connie Haines with Peter Potter (radio show host): Photo by Allan Grant//Time Life Pictures/Getty Images
 Beryl Davis performs "Don't Worry About Me" in London, August 1939 (audio) accompanied by Django Reinhardt on guitar and Stéphane Grappelli on piano
 78 RPM - Beryl Davis - Oscar Rabin Band - This Is No Laughing Matter (audio) - 1942
 Beryl Davis - The Touch Of Your Lips - (audio) with Russ Case and His Orchestra, 1947
 Beryl Davis I Hear A Dream GMB - (audio) - 75 mins compilation of classic tracks recorded in England from 1939 to January 1947
 Connie Haines - Beryl Davis - Rhonda Fleming - Jane Russell - film clip, 1954, singing gospel music
 Beryl Davis sings with the Bill Baker Big Band at Twinwoods 2003 (video)
 Beryl Davis: "Don't Worry About Me" Djangofest NW 2005 - video, with John Jorgenson band in 2005
 John Jorgenson feat. Beryl Davis - Don't Worry 'Bout Me - video, Culver City Music Festival in 2007
 Beryl Davis--Rare TV Interview with cable TV host Skip E. Lowe (28 mins).

1924 births
2011 deaths
Big band singers
British expatriates in the United States
English women singers
English jazz singers
Musicians from Plymouth, Devon
Traditional pop music singers
Deaths from dementia in California
Deaths from Alzheimer's disease
Burials at Forest Lawn Memorial Park (Hollywood Hills)
British women jazz singers